Internal Resources Division is a Bangladesh government division under the Ministry of Finance responsible for overseeing revenue collection in Bangladesh. Senior Secretary Abu Hena Md. Rahmatul Muneem is head of the division.

History
Internal Resources Division was established on 21 April 1979 as part of a re-organization of the Ministry of Finance.

References

1979 establishments in Bangladesh
Organisations based in Dhaka
Government departments of Bangladesh